Castres Olympique is a French rugby union club located in the Occitanian city of Castres and is currently competing in the top level of the French league system.

Founded in 1898, the club took its current name in 1906. They play at the Stade Pierre-Fabre, which is one of the smallest in Top 14 with a capacity of 12,500. The team wear blue and white kits.

The team won five French top-division championships in 1949, 1950, 1993 (in a match decided by an irregular try accorded by the referee), 2013, and 2018 as well as one Coupe de France in 1948.

History
In 1898 several alumni of Castres' municipal college met in a city centre bar and decided to create a team allowing them to play their favourite sport, rugby union. For the first few years this team was part of a multisport club until 1906. Unhappy with the dominating position cycling had within the club, the members of the rugby section decided to leave and create a club of their own, solely dedicated to their sport. It was decided that this club would be named Castres Olympique and its colours would be changed from yellow and black to its current blue, white and grey.

The new club reached the top flight after only 15 years of existence  and has remained there ever since, bar for a couple of years during the 80s when the club was in the then Section B of the 1st division. The club has never left the 1st division since 1921.

For a while Castres Olympique would experience mixed fortunes until 1948 when they reached and won their first Coupe de France. The prestigious championship would follow a year later, and again in 1950.

From the 1960s the club would experience a stream of mediocre seasons and steady decline until Pierre Fabre, the founder of a local pharmaceutical company, decided to take over the club and restore it to its former relative glory in 1988.

The 1993 French Rugby Union Championship was won by Castres who beat Grenoble 14–11 in controversial final.
Indeed a try of Olivier Brouzet is denied to Grenoble and the decisive try by Gary Whetton was awarded by the referee, Daniel Salles, when in fact the defender Franck Hueber from Grenoble touched down the ball first in his try zone.
This error gave the title to Castres. Salles admitted the error 13 years later

Jacques Fouroux conflict with the Federation and who was already suspicious before the match of the referee cry out conspiracy.

The club reached the final again in 1995 losing 31–16 to Stade Toulousain.

Castres won the 2012–13 French Rugby Union Championship beating Toulon 19–14 in the final.

The team's owner, Pierre Fabre, the founder of Laboratoires Pierre Fabre. died on 20 July 2013. Castres' home stadium, previously known as Stade Pierre-Antoine, was renamed in his memory during ceremonies in conjunction with Castres' match with Montpellier on 9 September 2017.

Castres won the 2017–18 French Rugby Union Championship beating Montpellier 29–13 in the final.

Honours
 French championship:
 Champions (5) : 1949, 1950, 1993, 2013, 2018
 Runners-up (3) : 1995, 2014, 2022
  Coupe de France:
 Champions (1) : 1948
 Challenge Yves du Manoir:
 Runners-up (1) : 1993
 Group B French Champions:
 Champions (1) : 1989
 European Challenge Cup:
 Runners-up (2) : 1997, 2000
 European Shield:
 Champions (1) : 2003

Finals results

French championship

Current standings

Current squad

The Castres squad for the 2022–23 season is:

Espoirs squad

The Castres Olympique Espoirs squad is:

Notable former players

  Horacio Agulla
  Rafael Carballo
  Carlos Ignacio Fernández Lobbe
  Santiago González Bonorino
  Ramiro Herrera
  Mario Ledesma
  José María Núñez Piossek
  Mauricio Reggiardo
  Michael Cheika
  Taylor Paris
  Martin Kafka
  Phil Christophers
  Marcel Garvey
  Paul Volley
  Seremaia Bai
  Semi Kunatani
  Alexandre Albouy
  Marc Andreu
  Grégory Arganese
  Éric Artiguste
  David Attoub
  Yoan Audrin
  Mathieu Barrau
  Armand Batlle
  Pierre Bérard
  Pierre Bernard
  Didier Bès
  Alexandre Bias
  Mathieu Bonello
  Paul Bonnefond
  David Bory
  Mathieu Bourret
  René Bousquet
  Marcel Burgun
  Yannick Caballero
  Alain Carminati 
  Romain Cabannes
  Thomas Castaignède
  Frédéric Cermeno
  Albert Cigagna
  Gerard Cholley
  Antonie Claassen
  René Coll
  Arnaud Costes
  Michel Courtiols
  Yann David
  Yann Delaigue
  Ibrahim Diarra
  Richard Dourthe
  Luc Ducalcon
  Brice Dulin
  Antoine Dupont
  Florian Faure
  Yannick Forestier
  Romain Froment
  Alessio Galasso
  Camille Gérondeau
  Karim Ghezal
  Rémy Grosso
  Raphaël Ibañez
  Vincent Inigo
  Anthony Jelonch
  Benjamin Kayser
  Daniel Kötze
  Laurent Labit
  Thierry Lacrampe
  Thierry Lacroix
  Pierre-Gilles Lakafia
  Remi Lamerat
  Benjamin Lapeyre
  Thibault Lassalle
  Christophe Laussucq
  Romain Martial
  Jean Matheu
  Lionel Mazars
  Ugo Mola
  Yohan Montès
  Lionel Nallet
  Mathieu Nicolas
  Pascal Papé
  Jean-Baptiste Peyras-Loustalet
  Lucas Pointud
  Julien Puricelli
  Ludovic Radosavljevic
  Marc-Antoine Rallier
  Nicolas Raffault
  Matthias Rolland
  David Roumieu
  Christophe Samson
  Olivier Sarraméa
  Maurice Siman
  Nicolas Spanghero
  Scott Spedding
  Patrick Tabacco
  Rémi Tales
  Guilaume Taussac
  Romain Teulet
  Sébastien Tillous-Borde
  Julien Tomas
  Christophe Urios
  Akvsenti Giorgadze
  Paliko Jimsheladze
  Anton Peikrishvili
  Tim Barker
  Jeremy Davidson
  Justin Fitzpatrick
  Pablo Canavosio
  Ramiro Pez
  Fabio Staibano
  Cristian Stoica
  Ismaila Lassissi
  Djalil Narjissi
  Kees Lensing
  Norm Berryman
  Frank Bunce
  Brad Fleming
  Carl Hoeft
  Daniel Kirkpatrick
  Chris Masoe
  Cameron McIntyre
  Kees Meeuws
  Kevin Senio
  Sitiveni Sivivatu
  Gary Whetton
  Karena Wihongi
  Rudi Wulf
  Jannie Bornman
  Robert Ebersohn
  Darron Nell
  Pedrie Wannenburg
  Dragoș Dima
  Adrian Lungu
  Mihai Lazăr
  Alexandru Manta
  Kirill Kulemin
  Piula Faʻasalele
  Laloa Milford
  Joe Tekori
  Freddie Tuilagi
  Romi Ropati
  Max Evans
  Richie Gray
  Glenn Metcalfe
  Gregor Townsend
  José Díaz
  Cedric Garcia
  Pierre-Emmanuel Garcia
  Rodrigo Capó Ortega
  Salesi Sika

See also
 List of rugby union clubs in France
 Rugby union in France

References

External links
  Castres Olympique Official website

 
Castres
Rugby clubs established in 1906
Sport in Tarn (department)
1906 establishments in France